This is a list of Hungarian football transfers in the summer transfer window 2016 by club. Only transfers in Nemzeti Bajnokság I, and Nemzeti Bajnokság II are included.

Nemzeti Bajnokság I

Budapest Honvéd

In:

Out:

Debrecen

In:

Out:

See also
 2016–17 Nemzeti Bajnokság I
 2016–17 Nemzeti Bajnokság II
 2016–17 Nemzeti Bajnokság III
 2016–17 Magyar Kupa

References

External links
 Official site of the Hungarian Football Association
 Official site of the Nemzeti Bajnokság I

Hungarian
Transfers
2016